Robin Prendes (born December 13, 1988) is an American rower. He competed in the Men's lightweight coxless four event at the 2012 Summer Olympics. The team finished in 8th.  At the 2014 World Championships, the US men's lightweight four boat that Prendes rowed in finished in 10th.

He also competed in the Men's lightweight coxless four event at the 2016 Summer Olympics. He started to row in 2001.

See also
 List of Princeton University Olympians

References

External links
 

1988 births
Living people
American male rowers
Olympic rowers of the United States
Rowers at the 2012 Summer Olympics
Rowers at the 2016 Summer Olympics
Sportspeople from Matanzas
Rowers at the 2015 Pan American Games
Pan American Games silver medalists for the United States
Pan American Games medalists in rowing
Medalists at the 2015 Pan American Games